In computer science, the Fibonacci search technique is a method of searching a sorted array using a divide and conquer algorithm that narrows down possible locations with the aid of Fibonacci numbers. Compared to binary search where the sorted array is divided into two equal-sized parts, one of which is examined further, Fibonacci search divides the array into two parts that have sizes that are consecutive Fibonacci numbers. On average, this leads to about 4% more comparisons to be executed, but it has the advantage that one only needs addition and subtraction to calculate the indices of the accessed array elements, while classical binary search needs bit-shift (see Bitwise operation), division or multiplication, operations that were less common at the time Fibonacci search was first published. Fibonacci search has an average- and worst-case complexity of O(log n) (see Big O notation).

The Fibonacci sequence has the property that a number is the sum of its two predecessors. Therefore the sequence can be computed by repeated addition. The ratio of two consecutive numbers approaches the Golden ratio, 1.618... Binary search works by dividing the seek area in equal parts (1:1). Fibonacci search can divide it into parts approaching 1:1.618 while using the simpler operations.

If the elements being searched have non-uniform access memory storage (i. e., the time needed to access a storage location varies depending on the location accessed), the Fibonacci search may have the advantage over binary search in slightly reducing the average time needed to access a storage location. If the machine executing the search has a direct mapped CPU cache, binary search may lead to more cache misses because the elements that are accessed often tend to gather in only a few cache lines; this is mitigated by splitting the array in parts that do not tend to be powers of two. If the data is stored on a magnetic tape where seek time depends on the current head position, a tradeoff between longer seek time and more comparisons may lead to a search algorithm that is skewed similarly to Fibonacci search.

Fibonacci search is derived from Golden section search, an algorithm by Jack Kiefer (1953) to search for the maximum or minimum of a unimodal function in an interval.

Algorithm
Let k be defined as an element in F, the array of Fibonacci numbers. n = Fm is the array size. If n is not a Fibonacci number, let Fm be the smallest number in F that is greater than n.

The array of Fibonacci numbers is defined where Fk+2 = Fk+1 + Fk, when k ≥ 0, F1 = 1, and F0 = 1.

To test whether an item is in the list of ordered numbers, follow these steps:

Set k = m.
If k = 0, stop. There is no match; the item is not in the array.
Compare the item against element in Fk−1.
If the item matches, stop.
If the item is less than entry Fk−1, discard the elements from positions Fk−1 + 1 to n. Set k = k − 1 and return to step 2.
If the item is greater than entry Fk−1, discard the elements from positions 1 to Fk−1. Renumber the remaining elements from 1 to Fk−2, set k = k − 2, and return to step 2.

Alternative implementation (from "Sorting and Searching" by Knuth):

Given a table of records R1, R2, ..., RN whose keys are in increasing order K1 < K2 < ... < KN, the algorithm searches for a given argument K. Assume N+1 = Fk+1

Step 1. [Initialize] i ← Fk, p ← Fk-1, q ← Fk-2 (throughout the algorithm, p and q will be consecutive Fibonacci numbers)

Step 2. [Compare] If K < Ki, go to Step 3; if K > Ki go to Step 4; and if K = Ki, the algorithm terminates successfully.

Step 3. [Decrease i] If q=0, the algorithm terminates unsuccessfully. Otherwise set (i, p, q) ← (i - q, q, p - q) (which moves p and q one position back in the Fibonacci sequence); then return to Step 2

Step 4. [Increase i] If p=1, the algorithm terminates unsuccessfully. Otherwise set (i,p,q) ← (i + q, p - q, 2q - p) (which moves p and q two positions back in the Fibonacci sequence); and return to Step 2

The two variants of the algorithm presented above always divide the current interval into a larger and a smaller subinterval. The original algorithm, however, would divide the new interval into a smaller and a larger subinterval in Step 4. This has the advantage that the new i is closer to the old i and is more suitable for accelerating searching on magnetic tape.

See also
 Search algorithms

References

 Implements the above algorithm (not Ferguson's original one).

Search algorithms